Climbing salamanders is the common name for plethodontid (lungless) salamanders of the genus Aneides. It contains 10 species native to North America, distributed between the Pacific Coast (7 species), Sacramento Mountains (1 species), and Appalachian Mountains (2 species). As their common name suggests, most of these species have prehensile tails and are quite mobile in trees.

Taxonomy 
The green salamander (A. aeneus) and the Hickory Nut Gorge green salamander (A. caryaensis) are now considered to belong to their own subgenus Castaneides, which diverged from the Aneides hardii lineage between 27.2 and 32.3 million years ago, during the Oligocene. Castaneides contains significant cryptic diversity and may contain more as-of-yet undescribed species. All other western Aneides including A. hardii are considered Aneides sensu stricto, and belong to the subgenus of the same name.

Distribution 
All ten known species in this genus inhabit mountain ecosystems in North America, and all but three are found primarily in the mountains of the west coast of the United States, Baja California and British Columbia. Of the three non-western species, the Sacramento Mountain salamander (A. hardii) is endemic to a mountainous region in New Mexico, while the two currently-described Castaneides species are endemic to the Appalachian Mountains of eastern United States.

Species
Ten species in two subgenera are currently assigned to this genus:

Nota bene: A binomial authority in parentheses indicates that the species was originally described in a genus other than Aneides.

References

Further reading
Baird SF (1851). Iconographic Encyclopædia of Science, Literature, and Art. Systematically Arranged by J. G. Heck. Translated from the German, with Additions, and Edited by Spencer F. Baird ... In Four Volumes. Vol II: Botany, Zoology, Anthropology, and Surgery. New York: Rudolph Garrique. xxiv + 203 (Botany) + 502 (Zoology) + 219 (Anthropology and Surgery) + xii + xvi + v (indices) pp. (Aneides, new genus, pp. 256–257 in Zoology).

External links
 Caudata Culture Species Database - Plethodontidae

 
Amphibian genera
Amphibians of North America
Extant Cenozoic first appearances
Taxa named by Spencer Fullerton Baird